Abacetus angolanus is a species of ground beetle in the subfamily Pterostichinae. It was described by Straneo in 1940 and is an endemic species found in Angola.

References

Endemic fauna of Angola
angolanus
Beetles described in 1940
Insects of Southern Africa